Kunzea jucunda  is a flowering plant in the myrtle family, Myrtaceae and is endemic to the south-west of Western Australia where it occurs on sandy or rocky soils of undulating plains. It is similar to Kunzea affinis and where the ranges of the two species overlap, hybrids occur.

Description
Kunzea jucunda is a shrub with a few erect main stems and many short side branches. The flowers are arranged in heads of mostly two to four on the ends of the side branches. There are eighteen to twenty four stamens in several rows in each flower. Flowering occurs mainly between August and October and is followed by fruit which are urn-shaped capsules with five vertical ridges. This kunzea is similar to K. affinis but is distinguished mainly by the mostly glabrous leaves and bracts. Where the ranges of the two species meet, hybrids often occur.

Taxonomy and naming
Kunzea jucunda was first formally described in 1904 by Ludwig Diels and Ernst Georg Pritzel and the description was published in the journal Botanische Jahrbücher für Systematik, Pflanzengeschichte und Pflanzengeographie. The specific epithet (jucunda) is a Latin word meaning "pleasant, agreeable or delightful".

Distribution and habitat
This kunzea grows in a wide range of habitats, but often occurs on sandy or rocky soils of undulating plains, mostly between the Stirling Range and Ravensthorpe in the Esperance Plains and Mallee biogeographic regions.

Conservation
Kunzea jucunda is classified as "Not Threatened" by the Western Australian Government Department of Parks and Wildlife.

References

jucunda
Endemic flora of Western Australia
Myrtales of Australia
Rosids of Western Australia
Plants described in 1904